"Du Willst Mir An Die Wäsche" (engl. "You Want To Get At My Undies") is a song by German alternative band Jennifer Rostock, and was released as the lead single from their second studio album Der Film on June 26, 2009. The song has peaked at #34 of the German Singles Chart and at #44 of the Austrian Singles Chart. The song was written by Jennifer Weist and Johannes Walter and produced by Werner Krumme and Christian Bader.

Track listing/formats

Music video
The music video for "Du Willst Mir An Die Wäsche" was directed by Uwe Flade and had its premiere on the band's website on June 6, 2009 and shows the band in a cinema playing visitors and staff. The movie in the cinema shows the band’s members in different movie scenes. Jennifer plays a super heroine, Baku is portrayed as Wolverine, Christoph as mummy, Alex as a gangland leader and Joe as a Dr. Evil adaption.

Chart performance

Personnel
Jennifer Weist - Vocals
Johannes "Joe" Walter - Keyboard
Alex Voigt - Guitar
Christoph Deckert - Bass
Christopher "Baku" Kohl - Drums

References

2009 singles
2009 songs
Warner Music Group singles
German songs